Sylvester Pendleton Clark was the governor of Grand Island, and the founder of Pendleton, New York. He built and opened a log tavern there and became its postmaster in 1823. He led a rebellion against government taxes in the early 19th century.

References

External links
 Genealogy of S. P. Clark(e)
 

New York (state) postmasters
 
American city founders